Euphaedra cuprea is a butterfly in the family Nymphalidae. It is found in Équateur and Sankuru in the Democratic Republic of the Congo.

Subspecies
Euphaedra cuprea cuprea (Democratic Republic of the Congo: Equateur and Sankuru)
Euphaedra cuprea irangi Oremans, 2000 (Democratic Republic of the Congo: South Kivu)
Euphaedra cuprea smaragdula Hecq, 2004 (Democratic Republic of the Congo)

References

Butterflies described in 1980
cuprea
Endemic fauna of the Democratic Republic of the Congo
Butterflies of Africa